Shahjadpur is a city ward in Bangladesh. It is situated under Dhaka North City Corporation. Shahjadpur is a ward under number 18. The mayor of Dhaka North City Corporation is Mohammed Atikul Islam. The area of Shahjadpur is surrounded by Gulshan, Badda, Gulshan lake, Notunbajar, and Khilbarirtek.

References

Wards of Dhaka North City Corporation
Neighbourhoods in Dhaka
Dhaka